Papa Demba Camara (born 16 January 1993) is a Senegalese professional footballer who plays as a goalkeeper.

He was part of the Senegal national under-23 football team at the 2012 Summer Olympics in London.

Career statistics

Club

Notes

Notes

External links
 

1993 births
Living people
Footballers from Dakar
Association football goalkeepers
Senegalese footballers
Senegalese expatriate footballers
Étoile Lusitana players
S.C. Braga players
FC Sochaux-Montbéliard players
Grenoble Foot 38 players
Ligue 1 players
Championnat National players
Expatriate footballers in France
Olympic footballers of Senegal
Footballers at the 2012 Summer Olympics
2015 Africa Cup of Nations players